WUBE-FM (105.1 MHz) is a radio station broadcasting a country music radio format.  Licensed to Cincinnati, Ohio, it is owned by Hubbard Broadcasting.

WUBE-FM has an effective radiated power (ERP) of 14,500 watts.  It broadcasts using HD Radio technology.  It airs an alternate country music format on its HD2 digital subchannel. The radio studios and transmitter are located just northeast of Downtown Cincinnati, two blocks from one another.

WUBE hosts the "Free Music Stage" At Taste of Cincinnati and Jammin' in the Country in neighboring Clermont County. Both events bring national known country music artists as well as local and emerging artists to the Tri-State area.

History

The station was originally known as WCPO-FM, owned by the E. W. Scripps Company, publisher of the Cincinnati Post, along with WCPO (1935) 1230 AM, now WDBZ) and WCPO-TV (channel 9).  One of the WCPO-FM announcers identified the frequency in the legal ID as 10-51 (ten-fifty-one) which was unique at the time. A video with audio of a WCPO-FM legal ID can be seen on YouTube. In January 1966, shortly after Scripps sold WCPO-AM-FM to Kaye-Smith Broadcasting, both stations changed their call signs to WUBE-AM & WCXL-FM. WUBE-AM switched to its long-running country format in April 1969. In October 1971, WCXL-FM dropped it’s good time automated music format to become country WUBE FM with the FM partially simulcasting the AM throughout the early 1970s. Then in 1975, the FM became the dominant signal. The Mornings and Afternoons were usually simulcast with Middays and Evenings split into separate air shifts. Then in September 1981, WUBE AM switched to WMLX Music of your Life format until 1985 when they switched to the original WDJO oldies until 1990 while WUBE FM stayed country.

Kaye-Smith Broadcasting sold WUBE-AM-FM to Plough Broadcasting in the late 1970s, with Plough selling the stations to DKM Broadcasting in 1984 (Approved by the FCC October 10, 1984). Two years later, both WUBE and what was then WDJO were sold to American Media. In 1991, American Media sold the stations to National Radio Partners, which later changed its name to Chancellor Media, and then to AMFM, Inc. in 1999. The following year, due to AMFM's merger with Clear Channel Communications, WUBE-FM was sold to Infinity Broadcasting (which became CBS Radio in December 2005), while their AM sister was sold to Blue Chip Broadcasting. CBS sold WUBE to Entercom on August 21, 2006, along with CBS Radio's other Cincinnati stations.

On January 18, 2007, almost as soon as it entered the Cincinnati radio market, Entercom announced its exit from the market by trading its entire Cincinnati cluster, including WUBE, to Bonneville International.  Also included in the sale were three radio stations in Seattle, in exchange for all three of Bonneville's FM radio stations in San Francisco, and $1 million cash. In May 2007, Bonneville officially took over control of the Cincinnati radio cluster through a local marketing agreement (LMA), with Bonneville acquiring Entercom's remaining interest in the stations outright on March 14, 2008.

WUBE was one of the winners in the 2008 NAB Crystal Radio Awards.

On January 19, 2011, Bonneville International announced it would sell WUBE and several other stations to Hubbard Broadcasting for $505 million.  The sale was completed on April 29, 2011.

See also
List of radio stations in Ohio

References

External links
B-105

Video with audio of a WCPO-FM legal ID 

UBE-FM
Hubbard Broadcasting
Radio stations established in 1979
1979 establishments in Ohio